Alfred Chester "Shorty" Ellsworth (1881 – 1963) was an American college football player and coach. He served as the head football coach at the Colorado School of Mines in Golden, Colorado from 1904 to 1907.

Ellsworth played college football at the University of Chicago, lettering under coach Amos Alonzo Stagg from 1901 to 1903. He was captain of the 1903 Chicago Maroons football team.

Head coaching record

References

1881 births
1963 deaths
American football centers
Chicago Maroons football players
Colorado Mines Orediggers football coaches